Gotham was a regional magazine founded by publisher Jason Binn in 2001 and published by Niche Media, LLC. The magazine covered fashion, philanthropy, arts, culture, real estate, cuisine, celebrity, entertainment, and beauty. Published eight times a year, it was distributed in Manhattan. The editor-in-chief was Samantha Yanks. The magazine was published by Debra Halpert until August 2011 when David Katz began to publish it.

According to a survey commissioned by the company, 56 percent of Gotham readers were male, with 51 percent married, and some two-thirds within the age group of 36 and 60 years old. Gotham was a sister publication to Hamptons magazine, sharing advertising and production.

Niche Media was renamed GreenGale Publishing in 2018. GreenGale was acquired by Modern Luxury in 2017. In 2018, Gotham was merged into its new sister magazine, Manhattan.

References

2001 establishments in New York City
2018 disestablishments in New York (state)
Defunct magazines published in the United States
Eight times annually magazines published in the United States
Local interest magazines published in the United States
Magazines established in 2001
Magazines disestablished in 2018
Magazines published in New York City
Visual arts magazines published in the United States